Dichagyris grandipennis is a species of cutworm or dart moth in the family Noctuidae.

The MONA or Hodges number for Dichagyris grandipennis is 10890.

References

Further reading

 
 
 

grandipennis
Articles created by Qbugbot
Moths described in 1883